Hugh S Andrews is a Welsh former international lawn bowler.

Bowls career
He won a bronze medal in the triples at the 1972 World Outdoor Bowls Championship in Worthing. He was capped 27 times by Wales between 1960 and 1972 and was the captain in 1970.

He won the 1971 fours title and finished runner-up in the 1972 pairs at the Welsh National Bowls Championships when bowling for the Brynhyfryd Bowls Club.

Personal life
He was a civil servant by trade and took up bowls after his discharge from the Royal Air Force in 1947.

References

1926 births
Possibly living people
Welsh male bowls players